Groot-Doringhoek Pass (English: Large Thorn Corner) is situated in the Eastern Cape, on the regional road R391 between Hofmeyr and Molteno, Eastern Cape.

Mountain passes of the Eastern Cape